Diamond, also known as Caseyville, is an unincorporated community in southern Raccoon Township, Parke County, in the U.S. state of Indiana.

History
Diamond was platted in 1893 as a coal town. The community's name alludes to the diamond-shaped deposits of coal.

Geography

References

Unincorporated communities in Indiana
Unincorporated communities in Parke County, Indiana